Gol-e Zard or Gol Zard or Gul-i-Zard may refer to several places in Iran:

Hamadan Province
 Gol-e Zard, Hamadan, a village in Tuyserkan County

Khuzestan Province
 Gol-e Zard-e Veysi, a village in Behbahan County

Lorestan Province
 Gol-e Zard, Aligudarz, a village in Aligudarz County
 Gol Zard, Borujerd, a village in Borujerd County
 Gol Zard, alternate name of Tazehabad Bahram, a village in Delfan County
 Gol Zard, Khorramabad, a village in Khorramabad County
 Gol Zard-e Bala, a village in Kuhdasht County
 Gol Zard-e Pain, a village in Kuhdasht County
 Gol Zard, Selseleh, a village in Selseleh County

Markazi Province
 Gol-e Zard, alternate name of Sang-e Sefid, Markazi, a village in Shazand County
 Gol Zard-e Malmir, a village in Shazand County
 Gol-e Zard-e Abdi, a village in Shazand County
 Gol-e Zard-e Qaleh, a village in Shazand County